Brigadier Richard John Cantrill,  is a senior Royal Marines officer. In September 2020, he assumed command of 3 Commando Brigade.

Military career
Cantrill joined the Corps of Royal Marines in 1996. He was promoted to major in 2004 and, in 2008, deployed to Afghanistan as officer commanding L Company, 42 Commando. He led the company during a three-day assault on Kasnishin, a Taliban stronghold, during the deployment, for which he was awarded the Military Cross. Promoted to lieutenant colonel in 2010, he became Military Assistant to the Deputy Chief of Defence for Military Strategy and Operations, was appointed an Officer of the Order of the British Empire in the 2014 New Year Honours, and was made commanding officer of 42 Commando. In 2016, Cantrill was promoted to colonel and made the chief of staff for the Commander UK Amphibious Forces.

Cantrill joined the Ministry of Defence as the Assistant Head for Counter-terrorism and UK Operations in 2018, and was appointed to command 3 Commando Brigade on 2 September 2020.

References

British military personnel of the Sierra Leone Civil War
Living people
Officers of the Order of the British Empire
Recipients of the Military Cross
Royal Marines Commando officers
Royal Navy personnel of the War in Afghanistan (2001–2021)
Year of birth missing (living people)